Malakpur Azizal (Arabic: ڈھوک سخی) is a village in the Islamabad Capital Territory of Pakistan. It is located at 33° 30' 0N 73° 16' 20E with an altitude of 522 metres (1715 feet).

Dhoke sakhi The village gets its name from the Azizal clan of the Tarkhan tribe, who make up a significant part of the population. Other clans include the Maknial and Koknial, also of the Tarkhan tribe.

References

Union councils of Islamabad Capital Territory

Villages in Islamabad Capital Territory